On December 15, a rapidly-deepening low-pressure area contributed to a historic expanse of inclement weather across the Great Plains and Midwestern United States, resulting in an unprecedented December derecho and tornado outbreak across portions of the Northern United States, a region normally affected by snow and cold weather during this time of year. Non-thunderstorm winds spurred the formation of rapidly-moving fires across Colorado and western Kansas, with attendant dust and debris spreading eastward. From central Kansas northeastward into eastern Wisconsin, the powerful derecho led to hundreds of damaging wind reports. At least 57 hurricane-force wind reports were received by the National Weather Service, signaling the most prolific wind event in the United States dating back to at least 2004. Numerous embedded circulations within this rapidly-progressing derecho produced dozens of tornadoes, including 33 that were rated EF2. The culmination of non-thunderstorm, thunderstorm, and tornadic winds caused widespread damage to structures, trees, power lines, and vehicles across the Plains and Midwest. At least 600,000 people lost power on December 15, and temperatures dropped significantly across the affected region following the event, causing accumulating snow, which hindered cleanup and recovery efforts. The storm killed at least 5 people directly, as well as 2 people indirectly through wildfires partly spawned by the storm, and caused at least $1.8 billion (2021 USD) in damages. The number of tornadoes in this event broke a record for largest outbreak in the month of December that had been set less than a week prior. The event also became one of the largest single-day outbreaks in recorded history, with 120 tornadoes occurring over an eight-hour period.

Meteorological synopsis

On December 15, the Storm Prediction Center (SPC) noted the potential for a widespread, damaging wind event across the Central United States. An attendant low-pressure area was expected to support a dry line and cold front down into northeastern Missouri.

Several other places in Upstate New York crushed daily highs on December 16. In Iowa, dew points surged to the upper 50s and lower 60s Fahrenheit, while convective available potential energy values – a measure of instability – were predicted to reach 500–1,000 J/kg. Given these factors, in conjunction with an eroding capping inversion, forecasters expected a narrow but intense line of severe thunderstorms to develop and overspread the Mid-Missouri and Upper Mississippi valleys. While damaging winds were expected to be the most widespread threat, a few tornadoes were outlined as a possibility, including the potential for one or two strong (EF2+) tornadoes. The highest dew point in Iowa reached .

The first tornado watch of the day was issued at 19:20 UTC and encompassed areas from northeastern Kansas northeastward into southern Minnesota as a rapidly-moving squall line developed. Much of this area was encompassed in a level 1/5 marginal risk when forecasters first outlined the severe potential on December 13, but it was rapidly upgraded to a level 4/5 moderate risk on the morning of December 15, the first moderate risk ever issued across Iowa, Minnesota, and Wisconsin in December.

Plains wind storm
In addition to damaging winds spurred by severe thunderstorms, damaging non-convective winds were expected to overspread much of the Central United States. Various offices of the National Weather Service placed a cumulative 84 million people under a high wind warning, an unusually large expanse of high wind potential. Indeed, the local weather office in the Twin Cities noted that "today's volatile day of weather has not been seen before in mid-December."

The intensity and breadth of dry winds resulted in very dangerous fire weather conditions across the Central Plains, where the SPC outlined an extremely critical risk area from the Texas Panhandle into central Kansas. By the end of the day, more than 600,000 customers were without power stretching from Colorado to Wisconsin.

Colorado
The Colorado Department of Public Health and Environment enacted an Air Quality Alert across the Front Range due to the expected combination of dirt and dust. In anticipation of the inclement weather, numerous school districts were closed or placed on delays. Dozens of state-managed and partner-managed coronavirus community testing, vaccine, and monoclonal antibody sites were closed. The Regional Transportation District in Denver advised that operational disruptions to services were possible. The annual Denver Christkindlmarket, a holiday market celebrating German tradition, and the nearby Monarch Mountain ski resort were closed. Rolling road closures were enacted along Interstate 70 and Interstate 25, the latter of which was the scene of at least six flipped semi-trailers. Closures were enacted across several smaller highways due to safety concerns too. In Pueblo, city bus services were suspended for three hours. In addition to tree damage, cars and fences were blown over, power lines were downed, and roofs were ripped off homes.

Denver International Airport reported 131 canceled flights and 475 delayed flights after it was placed on a ground delay, with an average delay of 129 minutes for travelers. More than 500 separate power outages were reported by Xcel Energy, culminating in more than 60,000 customers without power across the state. These outages impacted Penrose Hospital in Colorado Springs, where procedures and the release of patients were delayed. The Colorado Springs Fire Department responded to a large gas line break at the Chapel Hills Mall and evacuated that structure. Strong winds felled trees, causing damage to several homes in Englewood. One woman was injured when strong winds pushed her over and resulted in a broken hip.

Kansas

In preparation for inclement weather, multiple school districts in southwestern Kansas canceled classes. Strong winds stirred up dust across Kansas, causing the state's department of transportation to close numerous highways. Interstate 70 from the Colorado–Kansas state line eastward to Salina was closed because of crashes blocking the roadway. Two separate car crashes led to the deaths of three people across Kansas owing to poor visibility. A "life-threatening grass fire" was reported in Russell County by the Wichita, Kansas National Weather Service.

Derecho

During the afternoon hours of December 15, a narrow but intense line of thunderstorms developed across Nebraska and Kansas. This line of convection intensified as it moved rapidly northeastward, reaching eastern Iowa and western Wisconsin by the end of the day. Given the breadth of damaging winds associated with this thunderstorm activity, with over 400 instances of severe wind across a wide expanse of the Midwest, the severe weather event was officially classified as a derecho. The SPC logged 64 hurricane-force,  or greater wind reports, making December 15 the most prolific wind event in United States history at the time. The record was broken with 68 hurricane-force wind gusts on May 12, 2022.

First reports of damage filtered in from western and central Kansas. In Russell, gusts measured at  blew roofs off homes and uprooted trees. In southern Topeka, the Frito Lay Plant sustained damage. Kansas Governor Laura Kelly issued an inclement weather declaration for Shawnee County, sending executive branch agency personnel home. Semi-trucks were overturned in at least four locations across north-central Kansas. Over 200,000 residents across Kansas were without power at the height of the power outages, resulting in some of the most widespread damage statewide power provider Evergy had seen. Over 1,110 workers began to assess the aftermath of the storm, and requests for assistance were extended to neighboring states.

Widespread reports of toppled trees, overturned semi-trucks, downed power lines, and blown out vehicle windows were received by local authorities. In that city alone, more than 6,000 Lincoln Electric System customers were without power in the wake of the storms.

In Iowa, where the Department of Transportation closed bridges and the United States Army Corps of Engineers restricted access to the Saylorville Lake Dam in preparation for the weather event, similarly destructive winds were observed. Hundreds of reports of power outages filtered in across the state as widespread hurricane-force gusts were recorded, reaching  in Audubon. One man was killed after a gust overturned his tractor trailer. In neighboring Minnesota, another man died after a tree landed on him.

Further east, wind gusts in Illinois reached .

Tornado outbreak
The tornado outbreak set a new record for the most tornadoes to hit Iowa in a single day with 61, far exceeding the previous record of 35 tornadoes set on August 31, 2014. Additionally, 21 of the tornadoes in Iowa were rated EF2 which beat the previous record of 16 EF2/F2 or greater tornadoes set on June 7, 1984. Prior to this event, there had only been five December tornadoes in Iowa, all in southeast Iowa. This outbreak also marked the first time that tornadoes were recorded in Minnesota in the month of December. Additionally, it was the first time since record keeping began in 1986 that the National Weather Service Forecast Office in Sioux Falls, South Dakota had to issue both severe thunderstorm and tornado warnings during the month of December, with 6 and 8 issued, respectively. All of the severe storms took place in their coverage area in northwest Iowa. Total damage from the tornado outbreak amounted to at least $16.6 million in damage.

Confirmed tornadoes

Non-wind impacts 
The initial winter storm, unofficially referred to by The Weather Channel (TWC) as Winter Storm Bankston, entered the Western United States on December 13. The storm, being a category 3 atmospheric river event, brought heavy rain and snowfall to the Western United States. Around  of snow was recorded in Pinecrest, California. The storm caused statewide snowpack in California to increase from 19% of normal to 83% of normal. Portions of Interstate 5 in Northern California and southern Oregon closed partly as a result of this storm.

The storm also brought heavy snowfall to much of the Intermountain West, bringing significant snowfall totals to the metropolitan region of the Wasatch Front. The storm brought a foot of snow to Salt Lake City by the morning of December 15, and higher totals in the Wasatch Mountains, up to 21 inches in Snowbird. The storm caused significant delays along the Wasatch Front, with multiple school districts in the area either delaying or cancelling classes, and 120 to 130 crashes were reported during the storm by the Utah Highway Patrol. Rocky Mountain Power reported 4,688 customers without power in Utah.

Aftermath  
Most of the customers who lost power had power restored the next day. The Kickapoo Valley Reserve asked for assistance in cleaning up tree damage during the storm. Following the derecho, research was put in to determine if this storm, plus the tornado outbreak five days earlier, were connected to climate change. Around half of Iowa was declared a disaster area following the storm. Rudd, Iowa lost water following the storms.

See also

Weather of 2021
List of United States tornadoes from October to December 2021
List of North American tornadoes and tornado outbreaks
August 2020 Midwest derecho
Tornado outbreak of December 10–11, 2021 – Another historic December storm occurring only five days prior in the Southeast United States.

Notes

References

Extratropical cyclones
2021 meteorology
2021–22 North American winter
2021 natural disasters in the United States
December 2021 events in the United States
F2 tornadoes
Tornadoes in Wisconsin
Tornadoes in Iowa
Tornadoes in Nebraska
Tornadoes in Minnesota
Derechos in the United States
Tornadoes of 2021